KKOL-FM (107.9 MHz, "Decades 107.9") is a commercial FM radio station serving the Honolulu, Hawaii media market. The Salem Media Group outlet broadcasts at 107.9 MHz with an ERP of 100 kW and is licensed to Aiea, Hawaii.  Its transmitter is on Palehua Road in Kapolei and its studios and offices are in Honolulu.

KKOL-FM airs the nationally syndicated "Kool Gold" classic hits format from Westwood One.

History
KGMZ signed on the air on August 27, 1992, as a Top 40 station, only to flip formats to smooth jazz in 1994.  That would give way to its current oldies format in 1997. The station is now KKOL-FM and is now called "Kool Gold 107.9."

The station was assigned the KKOL-FM call letters by the Federal Communications Commission on December 26, 2008.

On January 1, 2021, KKOL-FM rebranded as "Decades 107.9".

References

External links
KKOL-FM website

KOL-FM
Classic hits radio stations in the United States
Radio stations established in 1992
1992 establishments in Hawaii
Salem Media Group properties